Gergő Lovrencsics (born 1 September 1988) is a Hungarian professional footballer who plays as a right winger or right-back for Prva HNL side Hajduk Split and the Hungary national team.

Club career

Lech Poznań
On 13 July 2013, it was announced that Lovrencsics has signed a contract with Lech until 2016.

Ferencváros
On 5 July 2016, Lovrencsics signed for Nemzeti Bajnokság I club Ferencváros. He said that his return to Hungary was a step forward since his former club Lech Poznań could not play in the UEFA Champions League or the UEFA Europa League having finished seventh in the 2015–16 Ekstraklasa. However, Ferencváros qualified for the 2016–17 UEFA Champions League.

On 16 June 2020, he became champion with Ferencváros by beating Budapest Honvéd FC at the Hidegkuti Nándor Stadion on the 30th match day of the 2019–20 Nemzeti Bajnokság I season.

On 29 September 2020, he was member of the Ferencváros team which qualified for the 2020–21 UEFA Champions League group stage after beating Molde FK on 3-3 aggregate (away goals) at the Groupama Aréna.

Hajduk

Gergő Lovrencsics has been injured at 29 August against Rijeka, he will miss from the pitch about 6 to 8 weeks.

International career
Lovrencsics made his debut in the Hungary national team on 6 June 2013, against Kuwait.

On 14 November 2014, Lovrencsics gave his first goal assist for the Hungarian team in 1–0 against Finland.

Lovrencsics was selected for Hungary's Euro 2016 squad.

He played in the last group match in a 3–3 draw against Portugal at the Parc Olympique Lyonnais, Lyon on 22 June 2016.

On 1 June 2021, Lovrencsics was included in the final 26-man squad to represent Hungary at the rescheduled UEFA Euro 2020 tournament.

Personal life
He has a younger brother named Balazs, who is also a footballer. Their surname is of Croatian origin.

Career statistics

Club

International
.

Scores and results list Hungary's goal tally first, score column indicates score after each Lovrencsics goal.

Honours

Club
Lech Poznań
 Ekstraklasa: 2014–15
 Polish SuperCup: 2015

Ferencvárosi TC
 Nemzeti Bajnokság I: 2018–19, 2019–20, 2020–21
 Hungarian Cup: 2016–17

References

External links

 Gergő Lovrencsics profile at magyarfutball.hu
 Profile at HLSZ
 

1988 births
Living people
People from Szolnok
Hungarian footballers
Hungary international footballers
Hungarian people of Croatian descent
Association football forwards
Ekstraklasa players
Nemzeti Bajnokság I players
Croatian Football League players
Budafoki LC footballers
Pécsi MFC players
Lombard-Pápa TFC footballers
Lech Poznań players
Ferencvárosi TC footballers
HNK Hajduk Split players
UEFA Euro 2016 players
UEFA Euro 2020 players
Hungarian expatriate footballers
Expatriate footballers in Poland
Expatriate footballers in Croatia
Hungarian expatriate sportspeople in Poland
Hungarian expatriate sportspeople in Croatia
Sportspeople from Jász-Nagykun-Szolnok County